Sariel Har-Peled (born July 14, 1971, in Jerusalem) is an Israeli–American computer scientist known for his research in computational geometry. He is a Donald Biggar Willett Professor in Engineering at the University of Illinois at Urbana–Champaign.

Har-Peled was a student at Tel Aviv University, where he earned a bachelor's degree in mathematics and computer science in 1993, a master's degree in computer science in 1995, and a Ph.D. in 1999. His master's thesis, The Complexity of Many Cells in the Overlay of Many Arrangements, and his doctoral dissertation, Geometric Approximation Algorithms and Randomized Algorithms for Planar Arrangements, were both supervised by Micha Sharir.
After postdoctoral research at Duke University, he joined the University of Illinois in 2000. He was named Willett Professor in 2016.

Har-Peled is the author of a book on approximation algorithms in computational geometry, Geometric approximation algorithms (American Mathematical Society, 2011).

References

External links
Home page

1971 births
Living people
American computer scientists
Israeli computer scientists
Researchers in geometric algorithms
Tel Aviv University alumni
University of Illinois Urbana-Champaign faculty